The 2011 Kentucky Indy 300 was the twelfth running of the Kentucky Indy 300 and the seventeenth round of the 2011 IndyCar Series season. It took place on Sunday, October 2, 2011. The race contested over 200 laps at the  Kentucky Speedway in Sparta, Kentucky.

This would ultimately be the last classified race of Dan Wheldon's career. In the following race, Wheldon would be involved in a 15-car accident at Las Vegas Motor Speedway, which would claim his life. The race was abandoned, and therefore was not classified as an official race. Buddy Rice and Vítor Meira were also in this and the next race, after which they made no more IndyCar starts, making this the final classified race of their careers as well. This was also the final classified race for the Newman/Haas Racing.

Grid 
Dan Wheldon, whose only race to date in the 2011 IndyCar series had been his win at the Indianapolis 500, replaced Alex Tagliani in the Sam Schmidt Motorsports #77 car.

† Did not qualify.

Results

Italics indicates the pole sitter

Bold indicates the podium

References

Kentucky Indy 300
Kentucky Indy 300
Kentucky Indy 300
Kentucky Indy 300